is a Japanese construction company founded in 578 A.D., making it the world's oldest company. The company mainly works on the design, construction, restoration, and repair of shrines, temples, castles, and cultural heritage buildings. While Kongō Gumi traditionally specialized in traditional architecture, increased competition from major construction companies due to the growing use of concrete in shrines and temples resulted in the company becoming a subsidiary of the Takamatsu Construction Group in January 2006.

History
Headquartered in Osaka, Kongō Gumi was a family-owned construction company for over 1,400 years. A -long 17th century scroll traces the 40 generations back to the company's start. It has continued operation through the founder's descendants. The practice of sons-in-law taking the family name when they joined the family firm contributed to the Kongō Gumi's long existence. As with many distinguished Japanese families, sons-in-law often joined the clan and took the Kongō family name. This allowed the company to continue with the same name when there were no sons in a generation. Thus, through the years, the line has continued through either a son or a daughter. Another factor for the company's longevity is the Buddhist temple construction business, which has been a reliable mainstay due to millions of Buddhist adherents. Over the centuries, Kongō Gumi participated in the construction of many famous buildings, including the 16th century Osaka Castle.

Kongō Gumi was one of the first construction companies in Japan to use concrete with wood to build temples after the Meiji Restoration. They also pioneered the use of CAD for temple design.

The company fell on hard times and went into liquidation in January 2006, and was purchased by the Takamatsu Construction Group. Before its liquidation, it had as few as 100 employees. In 2005 it had annual revenue of ¥7.5 billion (US$70 million), and it still specialized in building Buddhist temples. The last president was Masakazu Kongō, the 40th Kongō to lead the firm. , Kongō Gumi continues to operate as a wholly owned subsidiary of the Takamatsu Construction Group.

Timeline 
In 578, Kongō Shikō, one of the three Miyadaiku (specialized carpenters who build shrines and temples) invited by Prince Shōtoku from Baekje to construct Shitennō-ji, founds the company. Until the Edo period, Kongō Gumi remains the Miyadaiku for Shitennō-ji.

In 593, Shitennō-ji is completed. The construction method used to build it is still alive in the Kongō Construction's "assembly method."

In 1576, Shitennō-ji was burned down by Oda Nobunaga. The company participates in the construction of Osaka Castle during the 16th century. In the winter of 1614 during the Siege of Osaka, Shitennō-ji burned down again. It has been rebuilt seven times due to war and natural disasters, and each time, the successive Kongō Gumi worked to rebuild it.

In 1868, Shitennō-ji loses its temple estate, and Kongō Gumi could no longer receive the stipend from Shitennō-ji.

In 1903, Kongō Gumi builds the Daimon Gate.

In 1934, the Shitennō-ji Goju-no-to (five-story pagoda) collapsed due to the 1934 Muroto typhoon. Kongō Gumi was able to rebuild it under the leadership of Yoshie Kongō, the first female to become the head carpenter in the company's history.

In 1955,  Kongō Gumi becomes incorporated.

In November 2005, Shin-Kongo Construction, a wholly-owned subsidiary of Takamatsu Construction, was established.

In January 2006, the company transferred its business to Shin-Kongo Construction and most of its employees moved to the new company. The old Kongō Construction remained only in the real estate division and changed its name to KJ Construction Co., Ltd. The over 1,400-year-old Kongō family's management structure essentially closed its doors.

In July 2006, KJ Construction filed for bankruptcy due to insufficient funds. The total debt was about 4 billion yen.

In July 2007, they acquired all the shares of Nakamura Shaji, a company undergoing civil rehabilitation.

In May 2008, they established Kongō Construction Engineering as a subsidiary specialized in the construction and repair of yamakasa, danjiri, and mikoshi (floats and portable shrines used in festivals).

See also

 List of oldest companies

References

External links

 Kongō Gumi website 
 Nikkei Special "Dawn of Gaia" vol.296 Jan 8, 2008  - Introducing documentary program about reconstruction process of Kongō Gumi with Takamatsu

Construction and civil engineering companies of Japan
Engineering companies of Japan
Companies based in Osaka Prefecture
Companies established in the 6th century
Companies disestablished in 2006
2006 disestablishments in Japan
578 establishments
6th-century establishments in Japan
Shitennō-ji